Aleš Brezavšček (born 30 November 1972, in Mojstrana) is a Slovenian former alpine skier who competed in the 1998 Winter Olympics.

External links
 sports-reference.com
 

1972 births
Living people
Slovenian male alpine skiers
Olympic alpine skiers of Slovenia
Alpine skiers at the 1998 Winter Olympics
People from the Municipality of Kranjska Gora